The 2012–13 Longwood Lancers men's basketball team represented Longwood University during the 2012–13 NCAA Division I men's basketball season. The Lancers, led by tenth year head coach Mike Gillian, played their home games at Willett Hall and were members of the North Division of the Big South Conference. This was the Lancers first season in the Big South. They finished the season 8–25, 4–12 in Big South play to finish in last place in the North Division. They lost in the quarterfinals of the Big South tournament to VMI; the tournament constituted Longwood's first postseason appearance as a Division I school.

Following the season, Head Coach Mike Gillian stepped down from his duties as Head Coach of Longwood University. He led the team through their transition to Division I and posted a record of 94–215 in ten seasons. He was replaced by Cleveland State associate head coach Jayson Gee.

Last season
The Lancers had a record of 10–21 in their final season as a Division I independent school.

Roster

Schedule

|-
!colspan=9 style="background:#002B7F; color:#AFAAA3;"| Regular season

|-
!colspan=9 style="background:#002B7F; color:#AFAAA3;"| Big South tournament

References

Longwood Lancers men's basketball seasons
Longwood
Longwood Lancers men's b
Longwood Lancers men's b